Kani Moshkan (also Romanized as Kānī Moshkān and Kānī Meshkān; also known as Kani Mizhgān, Kānī Moshgān, and Kānī Meshgān) is a village in Abidar Rural District, in the Central District of Sanandaj County, Kurdistan Province, Iran. At the 2006 census, its population was 365, in 96 families. The village is populated by Kurds.

References 

Towns and villages in Sanandaj County
Kurdish settlements in Kurdistan Province